Martin Zürrer is a Swiss curler and curling coach.

Teams

Record as a coach of national teams

References

External links
 
 Stäfa / Zürrer - Curling Superliga 

Living people
Swiss male curlers
Swiss curling coaches
Year of birth missing (living people)